Litobothriidea is a monotypic order of Cestoda (tapeworms).  It contains only the monotypic family Litobothriidae, which includes only the genus Litobothrium.  Members of this order are gut parasites of lamniform sharks.

References

Cestoda
Platyhelminthes orders